Edward Joseph McNichol (February 20, 1895 – after 1930) was the head men's basketball coach for the University of Pennsylvania from 1920 to 1930. His first Penn team finished the season with a 21–2 record and was retroactively named the national champion by the Helms Athletic Foundation. This was Penn's second consecutive Helms national championship, the previous year's 21–1 team having later been recognized as the Helms (and Premo-Porretta Power Poll) national champion as well.

McNichol played on Penn's basketball team from 1914 to 1917. In his junior season in 1915–16, he was named a consensus All-American by the Helms Athletic Foundation. In both 1915–16 and 1916–17 he served as team captain and was a two-time Eastern Intercollegiate Basketball League First Team selection.

After his coaching career, he served in the United States Army during World War I. According to a 1919 edition of the Year Book of the Pennsylvania Society, McNichol was a sergeant in the 469th Railroad Engineers for the Army.

Head coaching record

Further reading

References

1895 births
All-American college men's basketball players
Basketball coaches from Pennsylvania
Basketball players from Pennsylvania
Guards (basketball)
Penn Quakers men's basketball coaches
Penn Quakers men's basketball players
United States Army soldiers
Year of death missing
American men's basketball players